"Amantes" is a song recorded by American singer Becky G and Spanish singer Daviles de Novelda, which features bachata music, her first song in the genre. It was released by Kemosabe Records, RCA Records and Sony Music Latin on September 16, 2022.

Background and release
Gomez first teased the song by posting a snippet of the track on the social media app TikTok, where she and a male singer can be heard. She later announced the single's release along with its cover art, revealing that the featured artist was Spanish singer Daviles de Novelda.

Composition
"Amantes" is a bachata and flamenco song with influences of rap and urban music. The song's lyrics find the artists asking their exes for a second chance, proposing for them to be "lovers" again.

Music video
The music video was released on October 7, 2022. It was directed by A Zazo Canvas. The video consists of homemade footage of Gomez around Spain where she had several shows. It has 4.5 million views as of March 2023.

Charts

Release history

External links

References

2022 singles
2022 songs
Becky G songs
Songs written by Becky G
Spanish-language songs
Bachata songs